Lexington Historic District may refer to:

Lexington Historic District (Lexington, Georgia), listed on the NRHP in Oglethorpe County, Georgia
Lexington Historic District (Lexington, Mississippi), NRHP-listed
Uptown Lexington Historic District, Lexington, North Carolina, listed on the NRHP in Davidson County, North Carolina
Lexington Historic District (Lexington, Virginia), listed on the NRHP in Lexington, Virginia
Several entries on the National Register of Historic Places listings in Fayette County, Kentucky